Homesick and Happy to Be Here is an album by the Los Angeles pop band Aberdeen, released in 2002.

Critical reception
CMJ New Music Report deemed Homesick and Happy to Be Here "a gentle collection of guitar pop with elegant vocals." The Los Angeles Times wrote that "the album is a charming combination of strummy bedroom pop, fuzzy and smoldering guitars, and girl-boy vocals highlighted by [Beth] Arzy's plaintive entreaties."

AllMusic called the album "a roomy, positively beaming sort of record of diamond-sharp mid-tempo indie pop, a uniquely delayed first attempt that runs somewhere between Jeepster earnestness and the flagrant sparkle of the Trash Can Sinatras' Cake."

Track listing

 'Handsome Drink' (3:16)
 'Sink or Float' (3:27)
 'Clouds Like These' (3:51)
 'Sunny in California' (3:50)
 'Thousand Steps' (5:22)
 'Homesick' (5:21)
 'Cities & Buses' (4:33)
 'Drive' (4:15)
 'In My Sleep' (4:50)
 'That Cave... That Moon' (5:52)

References

External links
 Page at Better Looking Records (including sample MP3s)

2002 albums
Aberdeen (band) albums